The 2014–15 CAA men's basketball season marked the 30th season of Colonial Athletic Association basketball, taking place between November 2014 and March 2015.  Practices commenced in October 2014, and the season ended with the 2015 CAA men's basketball tournament.

This was the first CAA season for Elon, which had spent the previous 11 seasons in the Southern Conference.

Preseason

Coaching changes
 After 3 consecutive 20-loss seasons and a 42-82 record in four seasons, UNCW head coach Buzz Peterson was fired and replaced by former Louisville assistant coach Kevin Keatts.
College of Charleston head coach Doug Wojcik was fired on August 5, 2014 amid allegations of verbal abuse toward players and assistant coaches.  He was replaced by former Clemson assistant coach Earl Grant.

Preseason poll

Preseason All-Conference Teams

Colonial Athletic Association Preseason Player of the Year: Marcus Thornton, William & Mary

Regular season

Head coaches
 Earl Grant, Charleston
 Monté Ross, Delaware
 Bruiser Flint, Drexel
 Matt Matheny, Elon
 Joe Mihalich, Hofstra
 Matt Brady, James Madison
 Bill Coen, Northeastern
 Pat Skerry, Towson
 Kevin Keatts, UNC Wilmington
 Tony Shaver, William & Mary

Rankings

Postseason

Colonial Athletic Association tournament

  March 6–9, 2015: Colonial Athletic Association Men's Basketball Tournament, Royal Farms Arena, Baltimore, Maryland

Northeastern defeated William & Mary, 72–61, in the finals of the 2015 CAA men's basketball tournament to win the conference, and earn an automatic bid to the 2015 NCAA Men's Division I Basketball Tournament.

NCAA tournament

The CAA has one bid to the 2014 NCAA Men's Division I Basketball Tournament, that being the automatic bid of Northeastern by winning the conference tournament.

National Invitation tournament 

The CAA has one bid to the 2015 National Invitation Tournament, that being the automatic bid of William & Mary by winning the conference's regular season championship.

College Basketball Invitational 

Hofstra was invited to play in the 2015 College Basketball Invitational.

CollegeInsider.com Postseason tournament 

James Madison and UNC Wilmington were both invited to play in the 2015 CollegeInsider.com Postseason Tournament

Awards and honors

Regular season

CAA Player-of-the-Week

 Nov. 17 – Brian Bernardi, Hofstra and David Walker, Northeastern
 Nov. 24 – Scott Eatherton, Northeastern
 Dec. 1  – Ameen Tanksley, Hofstra and Marcus Thornton, William & Mary
 Dec. 8  – Ameen Tanksley, Hofstra (2)
 Dec. 15 – Luke Eddy, Elon
 Dec. 22 – Scott Eatherton, Northeastern (2)
 Dec. 29 – Juan'ya Green, Hofstra
 Jan. 5  – T. J. Williams, Northeastern and Elijah Bryant, Elon
 Jan. 12 – Freddie Jackson, UNCW and Terry Tarpey, William & Mary
 Jan. 19 – Addison Spruill, UNCW
 Jan. 26 – Damion Lee, Drexel and Ron Curry, James Madison
 Feb. 2  – Damion Lee, Drexel (2)
 Feb. 9  – Ron Curry, James Madison (2)
 Feb. 16 – Scott Eatherton, Northeastern (3)
 Feb. 23 – David Walker, Northeastern (2)
 Mar. 2  – Ron Curry, James Madison (3)

CAA Rookie-of-the-Week

 Nov. 17 – Donovan Gilmore, College of Charleston
 Nov. 24 – Elijah Bryant, Elon
 Dec. 1  – Elijah Bryant, Elon (2)
 Dec. 8  – Kory Holden, Delaware
 Dec. 15 – Jordon Talley, UNCW
 Dec. 22 – Hari Hall, James Madison
 Dec. 29 – Elijah Bryant, Elon (3)
 Jan. 5  – Elijah Bryant, Elon (4)
 Jan. 12 – Kory Holden, Delaware (2)
 Jan. 19 – Tyshawn Myles, Drexel
 Jan. 26 – Kory Holden, Delaware (3)
 Feb. 2  – Mike Morsell, Towson
 Feb. 9  – Sammy Mojica, Drexel and Joey McLean, James Madison
 Feb. 16 – Jordon Talley, UNCW (2)
 Feb. 23 – Elijah Bryant, Elon (5) and Greg Malinowski, William & Mary
 Mar. 2  – Elijah Bryant, Elon (6) and Kory Holden, Delaware (4)

Postseason

CAA All-Conference Teams and Awards

References